The women's heptathlon event at the 1995 Pan American Games was held at the Estadio Atletico "Justo Roman" on 21 and 22 March.

Results

References

Athletics at the 1995 Pan American Games
1995
Pan